Bhim Bahadur Thapa (born 1944) is a Nepalese boxer. He competed in the men's featherweight event at the 1964 Summer Olympics.

References

External links
 

1944 births
Living people
Nepalese male boxers
Olympic boxers of Nepal
Boxers at the 1964 Summer Olympics
Place of birth missing (living people)
Featherweight boxers